William Osborne Cooper (13 February 1891 – 28 June 1930) was an Australian cricketer. He played one first-class match for South Australia in 1914/15. He also served in the 10th Infantry Battalion during World War I.

See also
 List of South Australian representative cricketers

References

External links
 

1891 births
1930 deaths
Australian cricketers
South Australia cricketers
Cricketers from Adelaide